is the second greatest hits album of Chara, which was released on November 11, 2000. It features material from her most commercially successful studio albums: Montage, Junior Sweet and Strange Fruits. It debuted at #2 on the Japanese Oricon album charts, and charted in the top 200 for 12 weeks. It eventually sold a total of 520,000 copies.

Two singles were released prior to the album. , the first, was used as the theme song for the drama  . This was the first time that Chara was offered to perform the theme song for a drama.  was used in a Kirin commercial advertising black tea drinks. The music video and the booklet illustrations were done in collaboration with Chara's then husband, Tadanobu Asano.

The album features all of Chara's solo singles released in the 1996-2000 period, however, it does not feature Chara's collaboration song with Yuki of the band Judy and Mary, . This single was extremely successful, selling over 200,000 units in 1999 and 2000.

A song titled Caramel Milk would later appear on Chara's forthcoming 2001 studio album, Madrigal.

Track listing

Singles

Japan Sales Rankings

References
 	

Chara (singer) compilation albums
2000 greatest hits albums